Suikkanen is a Finnish surname. Notable people with the surname include:

 Raimo Suikkanen (1942–2021), Finnish cyclist
 Kai Suikkanen (born 1959), Finnish ice hockey player and coach

Finnish-language surnames